(if) is the 9th album by the music group Diary of Dreams. It was released on March 13, 2009. The track "the Wedding" is the first major music video release for the band.

Track listing

Personnel 

Adrian Hates – lider guitar, bass, keyboards, vocals
Gaun:A – Guitar, vocals
D.N.S. – Drums
Torben Wendt – Keyboard

Technical personnel 

Rainer Assmann – mastering
Adrian Hates – mastering
Daniel Myer – producer
Florian Sikorski – vocal recording
Christian Zimmerli – pre-mastering

Diary of Dreams albums
2009 albums
Accession Records albums